Benny Rubin (February 2, 1899 – July 15, 1986) was an American comedian and film actor. Born in Boston, Rubin made more than 200 radio, film and television appearances over a span of 50 years.

Career
In 1929, Rubin went to Hollywood, where he began working as a supporting actor in films and began developing his ethnic characters. His film debut was in Naughty Baby.

Rubin was known for his ability to imitate many dialects. He performed in vaudeville with routines that included "English That's Different".

Rubin demonstrated his dialect talents as a panelist on the joke-telling radio series, Stop Me If You've Heard This One. He also provided the voice for Joe Jitsu throughout the television cartoon series, The Dick Tracy Show. In 1963, he played the second Indian Chief on an episode of “The Beverly Hillbillies.”

On radio, he played Professor Kropotkin on My Friend Irma, was a co-host of Only Yesterday, and was a member of the cast of The Bickersons.

He made frequent guest appearances on both the radio and television versions of The Jack Benny Program. A popular bit included Jack asking a series of questions that Rubin would answer with an increasingly irritated, "I don't know!" followed by the punchline.  In later years he made many bit appearances, sometimes uncredited, for instance in a number of Jerry Lewis features. He also guest appeared in an episode on the television series The Joey Bishop Show as the hypnotist, Max Collins.

According to Jack Benny's autobiography, Sunday Nights at Seven, he once cast Rubin to portray a Pullman porter. Although Rubin could do a convincing African-American dialect, the producer insisted he looked "too Jewish" for the part. As a result, Benny ended up giving the part to Eddie Anderson, and the porter character soon evolved into the famous "Rochester Van Jones".

He had a memorable turn in the Gunsmoke episode "Dr Herman Schultz M.D.", in which he played a physician who used his mesmeric skills to steal money.

He appeared in a 1961 episode of The Tab Hunter Show.

In 1968, he appeared on Petticoat Junction as Gus Huffle, owner of the Pixley movie theater, in the episode "Wings".  (The episode title is in direct reference to the 1927 silent movie Wings starring Charles "Buddy" Rogers and Richard Arlen, who also appear in the episode as themselves.)  Then, in 1969, he appeared again (credited as the "man patient") in the episode: "The Ballard of the Everyday Housewife".

Books
Jokes by Lew Lehr, Cal Tinney, Roger Bower and Rubin were collected in Stop Me If You've Heard This One (1949), a Permabook published by Garden City Publishing. Permabooks were designed with an unusual format of a paperback bound with stiff cardboard covers (with a "special wear-resistant finish") to simulate the look and feel of a hardcover book, and the company had previously published Best Jokes for All Occasions, edited by Powers Moulton.

The Stop Me If You've Heard This One Permabook featured a two-page foreword by Tinney, a one-page introduction by Bower, 66 pages of jokes by Bower, 85 pages of jokes by Tinney and 82 pages of jokes by Lehr. Under the heading, "P.S.", Rubin only had space for four jokes on two pages, as explained, "Benny Rubin was added to our show just before press time."

In 1972, Rubin published his autobiography, Come Backstage with Me.

Personal life
On March 26, 1927, Rubin married actress Mary O'Brien. They had a daughter and were divorced in 1934.

Rubin was the one disliked by The Three Stooges in the filming of Income Tax Sappy (1954), where he didn't like working with them. 

Rubin appeared in a total of six Three Stooges short subjects. Since three of them occurred after the one mentioned above, he seems to have been able to put aside any real dislike he had for the team.

Death
Rubin died of a heart attack at Cedars-Sinai Medical Center in Los Angeles on July 15, 1986. He is interred in Hillside Memorial Park Cemetery in Culver City.

Selected filmography 

 Naughty Baby (1928) - Benny Cohen
 Marianne (1929 musical film) (1929)
 Sunny Skies (1930)
 Crazy House (1930)
 Hot Curves (1930)
 Love in the Rough (1930)
 Leathernecking (1930)
 The March of Time (1930) - Himself
 Julius Sizzer (1931, Short)
 Dumb Dicks (1932, Short)
 Guests Wanted (1932, Short)
 The Girl Friend (1935)
 Sunday Night at the Trocadero (1937, Short)
 The Headleys at Home (1938) 
 Fighting Mad (1939)
 Zis Boom Bah (1941)
 Here Comes Mr. Jordan (1941)
 Double Trouble  (1941)
 Obliging Young Lady (1942)
 Tangier Incident (1953)
 Up in Smoke (1957)
 A Hole in the Head (1959)
 The Errand Boy (1961)
 Pocketful of Miracles (1961)
 A House Is Not a Home (1964)
 That Funny Feeling (1965)
 Angel in My Pocket (1969)
 Hook, Line & Sinker (1969)
 How to Frame a Figg (1971)
 The Return of the World's Greatest Detective (1976)
 The Shaggy D.A. (1976)
 Coma (1978)
 The Other Side of the Wind (posthumously released in 2018; scenes filmed in 1974–75)

References

External links

 

1899 births
1986 deaths
American male film actors
American male radio actors
American male television actors
American male voice actors
American radio personalities
Male actors from Boston
20th-century American male actors
Jewish American male actors
Jewish American comedians
20th-century American comedians
Vaudeville performers
Jewish American male comedians
20th-century American Jews